John Sherwin (c.1527–89), was an English politician.

He was a Member (MP) of the Parliament of England for Chichester in 1563, and Mayor of the borough in 1570.

References

1520s births
1589 deaths
English MPs 1563–1567
Members of the Parliament of England (pre-1707) for Gloucester